Written and illustrated by Yuu Watase, chapters of Arata: The Legend has been serialized in Shogakukan's Weekly Shōnen Sunday magazine since October 2008. Shogakukan collected its chapters into twenty-four individual tankōbon volumes, published from January 16, 2009, to September 18, 2015. Shogakukan started re-releasing the series in a two-in-one volume "remastered edition", which includes the original color page chapters from the magazine and various other modifications. The first volume was released on July 18, 2013. On May 14, 2021, Watase wrote on her blog that the tankōbon edition of the series would not continue being published and the series will only continue with the remastered edition. As of April 18, 2022, fifteen volumes have been released.

The manga is licensed for English release in North America by Viz Media, as part of their Shonen Sunday imprint. The first volume was released on March 9, 2010. The 24th and last volume of the tankōbon edition was released on August 9, 2016.

Volume list

Tankōbon edition

Remastered edition
Note: The remastered edition includes more chapters than the tankōbon edition, therefore, the numbering of the remastered edition do not entirely match with the numbering of the tankōbon edition. For example: chapters 208 and 226 of the tankōbon edition were numbered 226 and 243, respectively, in the remastered edition. In 2021, chapters 227–237 of the tankōbon edition and chapters 238–240, were republished in Weekly Shōnen Sunday, numbered as 244–257.<ref></p></ref>

Chapters not yet published in bound volumes
Note: The list of chapters follows the numbering of the remastered edition.

 283. 
 284. 
 285. 
 286. 
 287. 
 288. 
 289. 
 290. 
 291. 
 292. 
 293. 
 294. 
 295. 
 296.

Notes

References

Arata: The Legend